Fontannes is a commune in the Haute-Loire department in south-central France.

Geography
The Senouire forms part of the commune's southern border, then flows into the Allier, which forms all of its western border.

Population

See also
 Communes of the Haute-Loire department

References

Communes of Haute-Loire